Pusula is a village in the city of Lohja in Uusimaa, Finland. It was former administrative center of the former Pusula municipality. It has over 700 inhabitants.  is located on the southern edge of the village.

, a Sale grocery store, fire station, library, museum and elementary school are located in the village. Pusula's old town hall was sold to a private person in 2007 and is currently in residential use.

See also
 Karkkila
 Nummi-Pusula
 Saukkola
 Vihti

References

External links
 Pusula at Lohja's City Site (in Finnish)
 Pusula's location at Fonecta

Lohja
Villages in Finland